Logan Marshall-Green (born November 1, 1976) is an American actor and director. He is known for his roles in the television series 24, The O.C., Traveler, Dark Blue and Quarry, as well as his roles in the films 
Devil, 
Prometheus, Spider-Man: Homecoming, Upgrade and When They See Us.

Early life
Marshall-Green was born in Charleston, South Carolina, to teacher parents. He was raised by his mother, Lowry Marshall, in Cranston, Rhode Island, while she taught theatre at Brown University. He has a twin brother named Taylor. They both attended Barrington High School in the early 1990s. He did his undergraduate studies at the University of Tennessee, Knoxville, where he also wrote for the school newspaper, The Daily Beacon, as an entertainment writer covering the bar, music, and theater scene.

He attended the National Theater Institute in Waterford, Connecticut, and then went on to earn his Master's in Fine Arts from New York University's Graduate Acting Program at the Tisch School of the Arts.

Career
Marshall-Green appeared in both Law & Order: Special Victims Unit in 2003 and Law & Order in 2004, before landing recurring roles on Fox's The O.C. and 24.

Marshall-Green received a Drama Desk Award for his performance in Neil LaBute's play The Distance from Here in 2004.

In 2005 he performed in three separate productions: in June he played an anthropomorphic shark in Adam Bock's Swimming in the Shallows; in August he appeared as Bo Decker in a production of William Inge's classic Bus Stop; and in December he was Beethoven in the Peanuts spoof Dog Sees God: Confessions of a Teenage Blockhead (for which he received a Lucille Lortel Award for Outstanding Featured Actor nomination).

He played the villainous Edmund in the Public Theater production of King Lear starring Kevin Kline in the title role and directed by James Lapine. For his performance in King Lear and Pig Farm, he was nominated for a Drama League Award for Distinguished Performance.

In 2005, Marshall-Green appeared in the film Alchemy. That same year he also appeared in the Miramax film The Great Raid. Marshall-Green portrayed Tyler Fog in the 2007 ABC series Traveler. He appeared as Paco in the 2007 film Across the Universe. He featured as Dean Bendis, an undercover police officer, in a black ops group of the LAPD headed by Dylan McDermott in the TNT series Dark Blue. He played a young rookie cop the 2010 criminal drama Brooklyn's Finest directed by Antoine Fuqua, and had a lead role in the horror film Devil.

He appeared in the 2012 Ridley Scott film Prometheus as Holloway, a crew member aboard Prometheus. He also portrayed Will in Karyn Kusama's 2015 horror-thriller The Invitation.

In 2018, Marshall-Green starred as the lead in Leigh Whannell and Blumhouse's science fiction cyberpunk film Upgrade.

Marshall-Green made his directorial debut with the drama film Adopt a Highway, which was released in March 2019. The film starred Ethan Hawke and Betty Gabriel, and was produced by Jason Blum through Blumhouse Productions. The actor appeared in an episode of When They See Us, and starred in the video game Telling Lies, which was released in August 2019.

Personal life
Between 2008 and 2012, Marshall-Green was in a relationship with actress Marisa Tomei 12 years his senior. They were rumored to be engaged, but a representative for Tomei denied this.

He married actress Diane Gaeta in 2012. The couple has a son (born 2014). Marshall-Green is also a stepfather to his wife's daughter (born 2010), whose father was actor Johnny Lewis. Gaeta filed for divorce from Marshall-Green on April 5, 2019. The divorce was finalized on July 23, 2020.

Filmography

Film

Television

Other media

References

External links
 
 

1976 births
21st-century American male actors
American male film actors
American male stage actors
American male television actors
Golden Joystick Award winners
Living people
Male actors from Charleston, South Carolina
Male actors from Rhode Island
People from Charleston, South Carolina
Tisch School of the Arts alumni
American twins
University of Tennessee alumni